Unterjoch is a small village in the municipality of Bad Hindelang in the German district of Oberallgäu, Bavaria. It has a total population of 350 people.
The village is located at the foot of the mountain Sorgschrofen, which is a quadripoint between Germany and Austria, that divides the enclave Jungholz from the rest of Austria.

References 

Villages in Bavaria